Tsunokawa Dam is a gravity dam located in Gifu Prefecture in Japan. The dam is used for power production. The catchment area of the dam is 724.5 km2. The dam impounds about 15  ha of land when full and can store 879 thousand cubic meters of water. The construction of the dam was started on 1952 and completed in 1955.

References

Dams in Gifu Prefecture